Sigapatella novaezelandiae, common name the circular slipper limpet,  is a species of medium-sized sea snail, a marine gastropod molluscs in the family Calyptraeidae.

Description
The size of an adult shell varies between 15 mm and 33 mm. The white or yellowish-white shell is marked by growth lines. The spire  is often light violaceous. The shell is covered by a thin, fibrous, yellowish periostracum. The interior of the shell is white, more or less stained or blotched with violet.

Distribution
This marine species is endemic to New Zealand.

References

 Powell A. W. B., William Collins Publishers Ltd, Auckland 1979 
 Marshall B.A. 2003. A review of the Recent and Late Cenozoic Calyptraeidae of New Zealand (Mollusca: Gastropoda). The Veliger 46(2): 117-144

External links
 

Calyptraeidae
Gastropods of New Zealand
Taxa named by René Lesson
Gastropods described in 1831